The Structural Engineering exam is a written examination given by state licensing boards in the United States as part of the testing for licensing structural engineers.  This exam is written by the National Council of Examiners for Engineering and Surveying.  It is given in eight-hour segments over two days, with the first day covering vertical forces.  Problems involving lateral forces are covered on the second day. Each day's morning session features multiple-choice questions, while the afternoon sessions are devoted to essay questions.

References

Structural engineering
Standardized tests in the United States
Engineering education